Gonzalo Óscar Echenique Saglietti (born 27 April 1990) is an Argentina born Italian water polo player. He was part of the Spanish team at the 2016 Summer Olympics, where the team finished in seventh place.

He became World champion as a member of the Italian team at the 18th FINA World Aquatics Championships, held in Gwangju, Korea in 2019.

Honours

Club
CN Sabadell
Copa del Rey: 2011–12
CN Atlètic-Barceloneta
LEN Champions League: 2013–14
Spanish Championship: 2013–14
Copa del Rey: 2013–14
Copa de Cataluña: 2013–14
Pro Recco
LEN Champions League: 2020–21, 2021–22 ;runners-up : 2017–18
 LEN Super Cup: 2021, 2022
Serie A: 2016–17, 2017–18, 2018–19, 2021–22  
Coppa Italia: 2016–17, 2017–18, 2018–19, 2020–21, 2021–22

See also
 Spain men's Olympic water polo team records and statistics
 List of world champions in men's water polo
 List of World Aquatics Championships medalists in water polo

References

External links
 

Italian male water polo players
Spanish male water polo players
Living people
1990 births
Olympic water polo players of Spain
Water polo players at the 2016 Summer Olympics
Competitors at the 2018 Mediterranean Games
Mediterranean Games competitors for Spain
Water polo players at the 2020 Summer Olympics
World Aquatics Championships medalists in water polo
Olympic water polo players of Italy